Pon is a surname in various cultures

Origins
Pon may be:
An English surname, of unexplained origin
An alternative romanisation of the Chinese surname spelled in Mandarin Pinyin as Pān, which originated as a toponymic surname
An alternative romanisation of the Chinese surname spelled in Mandarin Pinyin as Pán, which some say originated from Pangu.
A Tamil name, meaning "gold"; Tamils and other peoples of South India traditionally use patronymics rather than surnames

Statistics
In the Netherlands, there were 62 people with the surname Pon and 170 people with the surname Du Pon as of 2007. (See tussenvoegsel.)

The 2010 United States Census found 1,419 people with the surname Pon, making it the 19,145th-most-common name in the country, up from 1,298 (19,313rd-most-common) in the 2000 Census. In both censuses, slightly fewer than three-quarters of the bearers of the surname identified as Asian, and between 10% and 15% as White.

People
People with the surname Pon include:
Ben Pon Sr. (1904–1968), Dutch automotive businessman
Maurice Pon (1921–2019), French lyricist
Ben Pon (1936–2019), Dutch vintner, son of Ben Pon Sr.
Jeff Tien Han Pon (born 1970), American government official
Josephine Pon (born 1970s), Canadian politician

People with the surname Du Pon include:
André du Pon (1924–2006), Dutch sailor
Dorothea du Pon (born 1943), Dutch diver

People with the patronymic Pon (either in full, or as an abbreviation) include:
Pon Arunachalam (born 1946), Indian writer
Pon Selvarasa (born 1946), Sri Lankan politician, Member of Parliament
Pon Sivakumaran (1950–1974), Sri Lankan Tamil militant
Pon Radhakrishnan (born 1952), Indian politician, member of the Lok Sabha
Pon Sivapalan (1952–1998), Sri Lankan politician, mayor of Jaffna
Pon. Muthuramalingam, Indian politician, member of the Legislative Assembly of Tamil Nadu
Pon Navarasu (died 1996), Indian student murdered in a ragging incident
Pon. Vijayaraghavan, Indian politician, member of the Legislative Assembly of Tamil Nadu
Pon Kumaran, Indian screenwriter and director
Pon. Raja, Indian politician, member of the Legislative Assembly of Tamil Nadu

References

Chinese-language surnames
Tamil masculine given names
Multiple Chinese surnames